Poshteh may refer to:
Poshteh, Chaharmahal and Bakhtiari
Poshteh, Rudbar, Gilan Province
Poshteh, Talesh, Gilan Province
Poshteh, Kerman
Poshteh, Kurdistan
Poshteh, Razavi Khorasan
Poshteh Karun
Poshteh Konji
Poshteh Shahan
Poshteh Shiran
Poshteh Shiraniha
Poshteh Talang
Poshteh-ye Ahmadabad
Poshteh-ye Barjan
Poshteh-ye Gish
Poshteh-ye Gurband
Poshteh-ye Isin
Poshteh-ye Kol Kol
Poshteh-ye Mazaj
Poshteh Mivaleh-ye Olya
Poshteh-ye Mowla
Poshteh-ye Olya
Poshteh-ye Sofla
Poshteh-ye Yek